Vestbanen, literally meaning "the West Line", may refer to:

 Copenhagen–Fredericia/Taulov Line, a mainline railway in Denmark
 Oslo West Station, a former railway station in Oslo, Norway
 Vestbanen (company), a railway company and a local railway line in Denmark
 Vestbanen Line, a tram line in Oslo, Norway
 Vestbanen, Norway, a neighborhood of Oslo, Norway
 Vestbanen (S-tog), a rapid transit line in Greater Copenhagen, Denmark